Reza Baziari (born March 21, 1973) is an Iranian football midfielder who currently plays for Shahin Bushehr in the Iran Pro League. He is currently the captain of the team.

Club career
Baziari joined Shahin Bushehr in 2001, and is currently the longest serving playing on the team.

 Assist Goals

References

External links

Profile on Persianleague

1973 births
Living people
Iranian footballers
Association football midfielders
Shahin Bushehr F.C. players
Persian Gulf Pro League players
Azadegan League players